Alexander Heath (born 21 September 1978) is a South African Olympic athlete.  In the 2006 Winter Olympics, he became the first African to participate in all five Alpine events.  He resides in Cape Town.

He said about Bode Miller, "I used to race against Bode, until he made the U.S. team.  I went to ski academy in New Hampshire ... I was close behind him in junior champs on a couple of occasions but I never beat him."

Participation 
 2006 Winter Olympics - Torino, Italy
 2002 Winter Olympics - Salt Lake City, Utah
 1998 Winter Olympics - Nagano, Japan

External links 
NBC Olympic profile

1978 births
Living people
South African male alpine skiers
Alpine skiers at the 1998 Winter Olympics
Alpine skiers at the 2002 Winter Olympics
Alpine skiers at the 2006 Winter Olympics
Olympic alpine skiers of South Africa